The Keating TKR  is a British sports car by Keating Supercars. It uses parts from the Saleen S7 and the Pagani Zonda. The company that produces it (Keating; formerly known as Barabus Sportscars Ltd) was founded by Tony Keating and is based in Bolton, Greater Manchester, England. The TKR features a twin turbo-charged 7.0L V8 petrol engine derived from the General Motors LS (LS7) series developing . According to Keating, it can accelerate from 0–60 in two seconds.

The TKR has been recorded travelling at 260.1 mph at the El Mirage Lake, California. 
In 2010 the TKR was set to be the car of choice to break the blind land speed record. Unfortunately, the car crashed on a test run and was unable to break this record.

Development

Barabus TKR

The idea for a car with the attributes of the Barabus TKR was born in 1996. The project was formed in the Italian town of Colonnella and included a plan to import the drive system from a factory in Great Britain.

Eventually, a prototype was placed on display at the 2006 British International Motor Show in London. The inaugural design of the car was inspired by the American Saleen S7 for its front section, and the Italian Pagani Zonda for its rear structure.

The TKR uses an eight-cylinder engine with  capacity and is equipped with two turbochargers. The engine produces 1005 horsepower, which classifies it among the most powerful production cars in the world, including the Bugatti Veyron 16.4, Bristol Fighter T, and SSC Ultimate Aero. The interior of the TKR is made from a combination of fine leather and suede, while the accents are provided by materials (such as brushed aluminium or carbon fiber) combined with painted highlights.

References 

Sports cars